Goniothalamus undulatus is a species of plant in the family Annonaceae. It is native to Thailand and Vietnam. Henry Nicholas Ridley, the English botanist who first formally described the species, named it after the wavy ( in Latin) edges of its leaves.

Description
It is a bush reaching 1.5 meters in height. Its oblong, hairless leaves are 17.8 by 7 centimeters with wedge shaped bases, cusped tips and wavy margins. The leaves have 11 pairs of secondary veins emanating from their midribs. Its petioles are 1 centimeters long and covered in fine hairs. Its flowers are born on pedicels that are 2.5 centimeters long.  Its 3 red, oval, ribbed, hairy sepals are 0.6 centimeters long. Its flowers have 6 petals arranged in two rows of three. Its red, leathery, oval to lance-shaped, hairy outer petals are 1.5 - 3.2  by 0.6-1.75 centimeters long. The margins of the outer petals are rolled back. Its triangular, hairy inner petals are 0.9 - 1.25 centimeters long. Its flower have 10-54 carpels. Its fruit have stipes that are 6.5-16 millimeters long.

Reproductive biology
The pollen of G. undulatus is shed as permanent tetrads.

Habitat and distribution
It has been observed growing in evergreen forests at elevations of 50 to 700 meters.

Uses
Bioactive molecules extracted from its roots have been reported to be cytotoxic in tests with cultured human cancer cell lines.

References

undulatus
Flora of Thailand
Flora of Vietnam
Plants described in 1920
Taxa named by Henry Nicholas Ridley